Donovan Estates is a census-designated place (CDP) in Yuma County, Arizona, United States. The population was 1,508 at the 2010 census.

Geography
Drysdale is located at  (32.709354, −114.678223).

Demographics

As of the 2010 census, there were 1,508 people living in the CDP: 736 male and 772 female. 586 were 19 years old or younger, 278 were ages 20–34, 230 were between the ages of 35 and 49, 289 were between 50 and 64, and the remaining 74 were aged 65 and above. The median age was 29.1 years.

The racial makeup of the CDP was 53.4% White, 0.6% Black or African American, 0.5% American Indian, 0.5% Asian, 0.4% Native Hawaiian and Other Pacific Islander, 38.7% Other, and 5.8% Two or More Races.  93.4% of the population were Hispanic or Latino of any race.

There were 374 households in the CDP, 333 family households (89%) and 41 non-family households (11%), with an average household size of 4.03. Of the family households, 221 were married couples living together, 27 were single fathers and 85 were single mothers; the non-family households included 31 adults living alone: 14 male and 17 female.

The CDP contained 394 housing units, of which 374 were occupied and 20 were vacant.

References

Census-designated places in Yuma County, Arizona